The Keyesville massacre occurred on April 19, 1863, in Tulare County, now Kern County, California, during the Owens Valley Indian War. White settlers and a detachment of the 2nd California Volunteer Cavalry under Captain Moses A. McLaughlin, killed 35 Tübatulabal and Owens Valley Paiute men, "about ten miles from Keysville [sic], upon the right bank of Kern River".

The orders
In early April, Lieutenant Colonel William Jones received a petition from citizens of Keysville and vicinity asking military protection from Indian depredations.  He forwarded the petition and notified his superiors in San Francisco of the action he was taking:

The report
Captain Moses A. McLaughlin, commanding the expedition to Keysville, made the following report about the incident:

Site of the massacre
The village where the Keyesville Massacre occurred has been identified by local Native American people as being on Tillie Creek, near the North Fork of the Kern River, now under Lake Isabella next to what is now Wofford Heights, California. This is used as the memorial site.

See also
Owens Valley Indian War
Indigenous peoples of California
Kitanemuk
Serrano people

External links
  Tübatulabal Memorial photo of  one of three crosses that stand above Lake Isabella in Wofford Heights. CA.

References

  The California Military Museum: California and the Indian Wars, The Owens Valley Indian War, 1861-1865.

History of Kern County, California
Native American history of California
California in the American Civil War
Massacres of men
Massacres of Native Americans
1863 in California
April 1863 events
California genocide
United States military war crimes
Owens Valley Indian War
Massacres in 1863
1863 murders in the United States
Violence against men in North America